The Washington Stealth are a lacrosse team based in Everett, Washington. The team plays in the National Lacrosse League (NLL). The 2011 season was the second season in Washington, and the 12th in franchise history (previously the San Jose Stealth and Albany Attack). The Stealth finished third in the West division, but defeated the Minnesota Swarm and Calgary Roughnecks in the playoffs to advance to their second NLL Championship in as many years. They played the Toronto Rock once again, but this time the Rock prevailed 8-7.

Regular season

Conference standings

Regular season

Game log
Reference:

Playoffs

Game log
Reference:

Roster

See also
2011 NLL season

References

Washington
Washington Stealth seasons
2011 in sports in Washington (state)